How High is Up? is a 1940 short subject directed by Del Lord starring American slapstick comedy team The Three Stooges (Moe Howard, Larry Fine and Curly Howard). It is the 48th entry in the series released by Columbia Pictures starring the comedians, who released 190 shorts for the studio between 1934 and 1959.

Plot
The Stooges are menders who drum up business at a construction site by poking holes on the bottom of the workers' lunch boxes, then offering to repair the holes. When their ruse is discovered, they are chased onto the site and blend in with a crowd of men seeking employment. Curly states that they are "the best riveters that ever riveted," and the hiring workman (Edmund Cobb) sends them to work on the 97th floor, despite Curly's debilitating fear of heights.

While riveting, Larry also heats sausage for Moe and Curly. The foreman discovers Larry, who proceeds to toss Curly an actual rivet, who claims, "It's a weenie, but it's kind of tough." Curly later uses a hard hat with a screwhead to engage the rivets while Moe drills them. The Stooges do a lousy job riveting and part of the building collapses when head foreman Mr. Blake (Vernon Dent) leans against a beam. He who is now angry and several men chase and fire both the Stooges off the construction site which they barely escape by parachuting off the building and landing in their wagon below, with the chute tarp now covering it, and drive off. Just as the scene fades out, the sound of an off screen collision is heard.

Cast

Credited
Moe Howard as Moe
Larry Fine as Larry
Curly Howard as Curly

Uncredited
Bruce Bennett as Workman with Lunch Box
Edmund Cobb as Construction Foreman 
Vernon Dent as Mr. Blake
Marjorie Kane as Woman on Street 
Frank Mills as Street Workman 
Cy Schindell as Construction Supervisor
Victor Travers as Man on Street 
Frank Pharr as Workman
Charlie Phillips as Workman
Bert Young as Workman
George Lloyd as Workman
Chet Brandenburg as Workman
Ed Brandenburg as Workman 
Sam Lufkin as Workman on Lunch Break

Production notes
Filming for How High is Up? was completed May 7–11, 1940. The aerial shots of the scene, straight down from the building the Stooges are working on, are from the then newly built Empire State Building in New York City.

The sweater removal scene is considered one of the finest examples of the Stooges' tendencies to use unorthodox methods to get the simplest job done. Since Moe and Larry cannot pull the sweater off of Curly, they figure the only way to do so is through the use of tools, such as mallets, chisels, and eventually a pair of scissors. Larry can be seen breaking character and laughing, particularly when Curly yells, "Don't mind me, don't mind me!!"

References

External links 
 
 
How High Is Up? at threestooges.net

1940 films
The Three Stooges films
American black-and-white films
Films directed by Del Lord
1940 comedy films
Columbia Pictures short films
American comedy short films
1940s English-language films
1940s American films